Piłsudski Square, previously Victory Square (1946–1990) and Saxon Square (1814–1928), is the largest city square of Poland's capital, located in the Warsaw city centre. The square is named after Marshal Józef Piłsudski who was instrumental in the restoration of Polish statehood after World War I.

Current and previous names
Over the centuries, the square has been named successively as Saxon Square (Plac Saski) after Poland's Saxon kings with the Saxon Palace standing adjacent to the square, but destroyed in World War II; then Piłsudski Square (after Józef Piłsudski) during the Second Polish Republic; then briefly, Adolf-Hitler-Platz during Germany's World War II occupation of Warsaw; and, after 1946, Victory Square in honour of Poland's and her allies' victory in World War II. Since the fall of communism in Poland, it is again called Piłsudski Square.

Piłsudski Square is the site of the Tomb of the Unknown Soldier, erected on top of the underground foundations of the Saxon Palace, destroyed by the Nazis in World War II.

History
The square has been the scene of many historic events over the centuries. Important guests of Warsaw and Poland have been officially welcomed there. Military parades have been held at the square since the 19th century Polish partitions. From the 1890s to the 1920s, the Russian Orthodox Church Alexander Nevsky Cathedral stood there. As with most of the other Moscow Patriarchate churches in Warsaw it was demolished in mid-1920s by the Polish authorities less than 15 years after its construction, and in 1928 the square was renamed after Józef Piłsudski.

It was on the Piłsudski Square (then Victory Square) in 1979 that Pope John Paul II addressed a large gathering of his countrymen at an open-air Holy Mass during his first visit to Poland soon after his 1978 elevation to the papacy. This event marked a more confrontational approach to the Soviet Union by the papacy and contributed to the eventual fall of communism in Poland. In April 2005, his death was mourned there also. Pope Benedict XVI celebrated an open-air Mass on the square on 26 May 2006, during his first pastoral visit to Poland. The square is now a location of some luxury shops, such as Italian Valentino and others.

Location 
The square is located in front of the 15–hectare Saxon Gardens extending south-west, close to the Zachęta and the Holy Trinity Church. The nearest metro station is Nowy Świat-Uniwersytet, a seven-minute walk away.

See also 

 Saxon Palace in prewar Warsaw
 Józef Piłsudski Monument, Warsaw

Notes and references

  Virtual Tour, at Warszawa.vr360.pl.

Squares in Warsaw
Śródmieście, Warsaw
Józef Piłsudski